Neon reticulatus is a species of jumping spider in the family Salticidae. It is found in North America, Europe, Turkey, Caucasus, a range from Russia (European to the Far East, Kazakhstan, Korea, and Japan.

References

Further reading

External links

 

Salticidae
Articles created by Qbugbot
Spiders described in 1853